Roger Wehrbein (born August 18, 1938) is an American politician and a former member of the unicameral Nebraska Legislature.

Early life
Born in Lincoln, Nebraska, Wehrbein graduated from Plattsmouth High School and the Agriculture College of the University of Nebraska-Lincoln. He was in the U.S. Army from 1961 to 1962, and was a U.S. Army Reserve company commander. Wehrbein married Jeanene Markussen on October 7, 1961; they have two, Douglas and David.

Political career
Wehrbein began his political career on the Cass County Fair Board and as Cass County Commissioner. He was elected to the legislature, representing Nebraska's Legislative 2nd district centered in Plattsmouth, Nebraska, on November 4, 1986, and was re-elected four times from 1990 to 2002. He was on the Appropriations Committee for 18 years, and chaired the committee for 10 years.

Personal life
Wehrbein continued to work on his family's farm, alongside his three brothers, while serving as representative and after his term ended. He also has worked on the Plattsmouth Bridge Commission, and participated in the movement to build a new university fraternity house for Alpha Gamma Rho.

Wehrbein's wife, Jeanene, died on November 6, 2016.

Honors and awards
 Nebraskan of the Year, Rotary Clubs of Nebraska, 2008
 Alumni Service Award, College of Agricultural Sciences and Natural Resources, 2003/2004
 Nebraska Hall of Agriculture Achievement
 Omaha Agribusiness Club Gamma Sigma Delta honoree, 1999
 Nebraska Agribusiness Club honoree, 1980
 Alpha Gamma Rho outstanding alumnus, 1976, 1981
 Omaha Area Kiwanis Farm Family of the Year, 1984
 UNL Block and Bridle Club honoree, 1993.
 Alternate delegate, 1996 Republican National Convention

References

External links
 

1938 births
County supervisors and commissioners in Nebraska
Living people
University of Nebraska–Lincoln alumni
Republican Party Nebraska state senators
United States Army officers
Politicians from Lincoln, Nebraska
People from Plattsmouth, Nebraska